The Little Sugar River is a  tributary of the Sugar River in the U.S. state of Wisconsin.

It rises in Dane County, just north of New Glarus, and flows southeasterly, joining the Sugar River at the mill pond in Albany.  The river above New Glarus is considered a class II trout stream by the DNR (1980).

The river widens below New Glarus, and some large wetlands exist bordering it, along the Sugar River State Trail.

See also
List of Wisconsin rivers

References

Rivers of Wisconsin
Rivers of Dane County, Wisconsin
Rivers of Green County, Wisconsin